Naykrascha Myt is the compilation album from the Ukrainian ska-punk band Mad Heads XL . This release was dedicated to 15 years history of Mad Heads and Mad Heads XL bands. It was released in Ukraine and include one new track "Naykrascha Myt".

Album consisted  cover song of Don't Worry be happy by Bobby McFerrin with lyrics translated on Ukrainian.

Track listing
 " Найкраща Мить" (Naykrascha Myt) - 4:33
 " Розслабся, Не Парся" (Rozslabsya,Ne Parsya - Don't Worry) - 3:39
 " Надія Є" (Nadiya Yea) - 4:37
 " Автобус Буратін" (Avtobus Buratin) - 3:24
 " Пісня світла" (Pisnya Svitla) - 3:34
 " Смерека" (Smereka) - 3:03
 " Не Чекай" (Ne Chekay) - 3:46
 " Не По Пути" (Ne Po Puti) - 2:37
 " Отрута" (Otruta) - 3:16
 " Вженема"- (Vzenema) 3:24
 " Полетаем" - (Poletaem) 4:09
 " Flew Away" - 5:03
 " Tonight I'm Alone" - 2:59
 " The Road" - 4:33
 " По Барабану" - 3:27
 " Sharks" - 2:46
 " Corrida" - 3:20
 " Black Cat" - 3:57
 " Treat Me Bad" - 4:22
 " Mad Heads Boogie" - 2:38
 " Twanging, Beating & Shouts" - 4:25

Video
 Найкраща Мить (Naykrascha Myt) by U. Morozov

Personnel
 Vadym Krasnooky – vocal, guitars
 Maxym Krasnooky – spacebass
 Bogdan Ocheretyany – drums
 Maxym Kochetov - saxophone
 Vadym Nikitan - trumpet
 Valeriy Chesnokov - trombone

2007 compilation albums
Mad Heads albums
Mad Heads XL albums